"Over Under Sideways Down" is a 1966 song by English rock group the Yardbirds. A composition credited to all members of the group, it combines elements of blues rock and psychedelic rock. It was first released as a single in May 1966 as a follow-up to "Shapes of Things" and in July was included on group's self-titled UK album (commonly known as Roger the Engineer and Over Under Sideways Down in the US and elsewhere).

Composition and recording
According to Yardbirds drummer Jim McCarty, the basic outline for "Over Under Sideways Down" was inspired by Bill Haley and His Comets' "Rock Around the Clock". The group had heard Haley's song on the radio after a gig and considered adapting it in their own style. At a later recording session, guitarist Jeff Beck started by playing the song's bassline and the group were soon working out an arrangement. Beck then switched to lead guitar and came up with the intro. McCarty recalled:

Although McCarty felt that all of the group contributed to the lyrics, producer Simon Napier-Bell attributed them to singer Keith Relf. He also claims that Relf's original verse "Over under sideways down, That's the best way I have found" was changed to "Over under sideways down, Backwards forwards square and round", because BBC censors might have objected to the vaguely suggestive line.

Releases and charts
Columbia issued "Over Under Sideways Down" in the UK as a single on 27 May 1966, with Epic in the US following on 13 June. The B-side, the instrumental "Jeff's Boogie", is credited to Beck, however, it has been described as "a near copy of Chuck Berry's 'Guitar Boogie'".  The single became the Yardbirds' fifth single to reach the UK top 10 chart, where it peaked at number10; in the US, it reached number13. 

In July 1966, the song was released on Yardbirds, the group's first studio album in the UK and in August on the US edition titled after the song. As one of the group's most popular pieces, "Over Under Sideways Down" it is included on many anthologies, such as The Yardbirds Greatest Hits (1967) and Ultimate! (2001). A live performance with Beck's replacement, Jimmy Page, recorded in New York City in 1968, is included on the Page-produced Yardbirds '68 (2017).

Recognition
Rolling Stone magazine ranked "Over Under Sideways Down" at number 23 on its list of the 100 Greatest Guitar Songs of All Time.

References

Bibliography

1966 songs
1966 singles
The Yardbirds songs
Songs written by Jeff Beck
Songs written by Paul Samwell-Smith
Songs written by Keith Relf
Songs written by Jim McCarty
Epic Records singles
Columbia Graphophone Company singles